The Utah Utes softball team represents University of Utah in NCAA Division I college softball.  The team participates in the Pac-12 Conference. The Utes are currently led by head coach Amy Hogue. The team plays its home games at Dumke Family Softball Stadium located on the university's campus.

History

Coaching history

Championships

Conference Championships

Conference Tournament Championships

Coaching staff

Awards and honors

National awards
Sources:
All-Americans
1981: Melonie Kent, (1st team)
1982: Cindy Lyon, (1st team)
1985: Annette Ausseresses, (1st team)
1985: Michele Townsend, (2nd team)
1987: Pipi Hollingworth, (2nd team)
1990: Charmelle Green, 
1991: Charmelle Green, 
1994: Amy (Timmel) Hogue, (2nd team)
1994: Ali (Andrus) Sagas, (2nd team)
1997: Sandy Rhea, (1st team)
1998: Sandy Rhea, (2nd team)
2000: Sunny Smith, (2nd team)
2006: Jackie Wong, (2nd team)
2014: Hannah Flippen, 2nd base (2nd team)
2016: Hannah Flippen, 2nd base (3rd team)
2017: Hannah Flippen, 2nd base (1st team)

Conference awards
Sources:
WAC Player of the Year
Charmelle Green, 1991
Amy Hogue, 1994

WAC Freshman of the Year
Deb DiMeglio, 1991
Ali (Andrus) Saugus, 1994

MWC Player of the Year
Kristin Arbogast, 2000
Lyndsey Trevis, 2001

MWC Freshman of the Year
Niki Hayhurst, 2000

Pac-12 Player of the Year
Hannah Flippen, 2016, 2017

Pac-12 Defensive Player of the Year
Hannah Flippen, 2017

Pac-12 Coach of the Year
Amy Hogue (2015)

References